National Beer Day is celebrated in the United States every year on April 7, marking the day that the Cullen–Harrison Act came into force after having been signed into law by President Franklin D. Roosevelt on March 22, 1933. This led to the Eighteenth Amendment being repealed on December 5, 1933, with the ratification of the Twenty-first Amendment to the U.S. Constitution. April 6, the day prior to National Beer Day, is known as New Beer's Eve.

Background
Prohibition in the United States on the national level revolved around the 18th Amendment to the Constitution, which generally banned "intoxicating liquors" but did not define the term.  The Volstead Act defined intoxicating liquors as any containing more than 0.5% alcohol. The law was amended in 1933 by the Cullen-Harrison Act to raise the threshold enough to allow the production of mild beer.  The beer could contain up to 3.2% alcohol by weight (or 4.05% by volume) compared to the 0.5% limit because 3.2% was considered too low to produce intoxication.

Upon signing the legislation, Franklin Roosevelt made his famous remark, "I think this would be a good time for a beer." The law went into effect on April 7 of that year (1933) in states that had enacted their own law allowing such sales. People across the country responded by gathering outside breweries, some beginning the night before. On that first day, 1.5 million barrels of beer were consumed, inspiring the future holiday. Today, April 7 is recognized as National Beer Day, and April 6 is known as New Beer's Eve.

The Cullen-Harrison Act was not the official end of prohibition in the U.S. (that happened on December 5, 1933, when the 21st Amendment was ratified). As such, April 7 is a beer-specific holiday, as opposed to Repeal Day, celebrated on December 5.

Recognition
National Beer Day was first celebrated in 2009 by Justin Smith of Richmond, Virginia. After much prodding from his friend, Mike Connolly, Smith started a Facebook page that Colorado Beer Examiner Eli Shayotovich noticed. Smith's promotion of the new observance day via various social media outlets was rewarded when the beer drinking app Untappd created a badge for National Beer Day that rewarded participants that checked a beer into the app on April 7. National Beer Day has since been trending on social media every year on April 7 using the hashtag #NationalBeerDay.

National Beer Day was officially recognized by Virginia Governor Terry McAuliffe in 2017.

National Beer Day was officially recognized in the Congressional Record by Congressman Dave Brat in 2017.

In 2018, the Virginia General Assembly passed a joint resolution recognizing National Beer Day in the Commonwealth of Virginia.

See also

References

Annual events in the United States
Beer day
Beer culture
Beer festivals in the United States
Beer in the United States
Observances about food and drink
Prohibition in the United States
Recurring events established in 2009
Beer day